Child and Adolescent Mental Health Services (CAMHS) is the name for NHS-provided services in the United Kingdom for children, generally until school-leaving age, who are having difficulties with their emotional well-being or are deemed to have persistent behavioural problems. CAMHS are organised locally, and the exact services provided may vary, often by local government area.

History
In Europe and the United States child-centred mental health did not become a medical specialty until after World War I. In the United Kingdom children's and young people's mental health treatment was for decades the remit of the Child Guidance Movement increasingly working after World War II with local educational authorities and often influenced by psychoanalytic ideas. Provision in NHS hospitals was piecemeal across the country and disconnected from the youth justice system. However opposition to Psychoanalysis with its pioneering research work into childhood and adolescence, which was poorly understood by proponents of the Medical model, caused the service to be abandoned in favour of evidence-based medicine and evidence-based education. This led to the eclipse of the multidisciplinary child guidance approach in the 1990s and a public policy-motivated formal take-over by the NHS.

The development of CAMHS within a four-tiered framework started in 1995. In 1998, 24 CAMHS Innovation Projects started, and the Crime and Disorder Act 1998 established related youth offending teams. In 2000 the NHS Plan Implementation Programme required health and local authorities to jointly produce a local CAMHS strategy.

In November 2008 the independent CAMHS Review was published.

From about 2013 onward major concerns have been expressed about reductions in CAMHS, and apparently increasing demand, and in 2014 the parliamentary Health Select Committee investigated and reported on provision. In 2015 the government published a review, and promised a funding increase of about £250 million per year. However the funds were not ring-fenced and as of 2016 only about half of England's Clinical commissioning groups had increased local CAMHS funding. CAMHS funding remains a popular topic for political announcements of funding and the current aim is to increase funding to the level that 35% of young people with a disorder are able to receive a specialist service. Different models of service organisation are also advocated as part of this transformation.

In Scotland, between 2007 and 2016 the number of CAMHS psychologists had doubled, reflecting increased demand for the service.  However in September 2020, 53.5% of CAMHS patients in Scotland had waited for an appointment longer than the 18 weeks target, and in Glasgow the average waiting time was 26 weeks.

131 new CAMHS beds were commissioned  by NHS England in 2018, increasing the existing 1,440 bed base by more than 10%.  56 will be in London, 12 at Bodmin Hospital and 22 at St Mary’s Hospital in Leeds.

Service framework
In the UK CAMHS are organised around a four tier system:

Tier 1
general advice and treatment for less severe problems by non-mental health specialists working in general services, such as GPs, school nurses, social workers, and voluntary agencies.

Tier 2
usually CAMHS specialists working in community and primary care, such as mental health workers and counsellors working in clinics, schools and youth services.

Tier 3
usually a multi-disciplinary team or service working in a community mental health clinic providing a specialised service for more severe disorders, with team members including psychiatrists, social workers, board certified behaviour analysts,  clinical psychologists, psychotherapists and other therapists.

Tier 4
highly specialist services for children and young people with serious problems, such as day units, specialised outpatient teams and in-patient units.

Specialist CAMHS – Tiers 3 and 4
Generally patients cannot self-refer to Tier 3 or 4 services, which are sometimes called specialist CAMHS.  Referrals can be made by a wide range of agencies and professionals, including GPs and school nurses.

The aim is to have a team led by a consultant psychiatrist, although other models exist and there is limited evidence of what system works best. It is suggested that there should be a consultant psychiatrist for a total population of 75,000, although in most of the UK this standard is not met.

The Tier 4 service includes hospital care, with about 1,450 hospital beds provided in England for adolescents aged 13 to 18. Typical conditions that sometime require hospital care include depression, psychoses, eating disorders and severe anxiety disorders.

The service may, depending on locality, include:
Art therapy
Child psychiatry
Clinical psychology
Drama therapy
Educational psychology
Family therapy
Music therapy
Occupational therapy
Play therapy
Psychiatric nursing
Social worker interface
Speech therapy
Child psychotherapy
Forensic CAMHS, working with young offenders or those at risk of offending

Performance
As of December 2016, some young English people with eating disorders were being sent hundreds of miles away to Scotland because the services they required were not available locally. Not withstanding good care in Scotland it was said that being away from friends and family compromised their recovery. In response the government had adopted a policy of ending such arrangements by 2021, and had allocated a cumulative £150M to improve local availability of care. Many had complex mental health issues frequently involving a risk of self-harm or suicide, like severe depression, eating disorders, psychosis and personality disorders.

In 2017-18 at least 539 children assessed as needing Tier 3 child and adolescent mental health services care waited more than a year to start treatment, according to a Health Service Journal survey which elicited reports from 33 out of the 50 mental health trusts.

See also
Child Guidance
Mental health in the United Kingdom
Mental health trust

References

External links
 
 

Mental health in the United Kingdom
National Health Service
Child and adolescent psychiatry